Alen Hodžić (born August 8, 1992 in Koper, Slovenia) is a Slovenian professional basketball player who last played for Cedevita Olimpija of the Slovenian League.

Professional career
Hodžić started playing professional basketball for Luka Koper. In May 2017, Hodžić signed with Sixt Primorska. He helped the club win the Slovenian League and the Slovenian Cup.

On May 29, 2020, he signed a two-year deal with Cedevita Olimpija.

National team career
Hodžić debuted for the Slovenian national basketball team in 2020.

References

External links
 Profile at Eurobasket.com
 ABA 2 profile
 Profile at Realgm.com
Profile at Proballers.com

1992 births
Living people
Guards (basketball)
KD Hopsi Polzela players
KK Cedevita Olimpija players
Slovenian men's basketball players
Sportspeople from Koper
Helios Suns players